Ruth Sutherland (1884–1948), was an Australian painter and art critic. She was a founding member of the Twenty Melbourne Painters Society.

Biography
Sutherland was born in Adelaide in 1884. She was granddaughter to notable sketcher George Sutherland, who emigrated to Australia from Scotland. She was a pupil of Gwen Barringer in South Australia before coming to Melbourne. She attended the National Gallery of Victoria Art School where she was taught by Lindsay Bernard Hall.

Sutherland wrote articles for the Melbourne newspaper 'The Age' and to the journal 'Art in Australia' about Max Meldrum and Hilda Rix Nicholas. 

Sutherland was the niece of the painter Jane Sutherland and the sister of the composer Margaret Sutherland. She was also a cousin of Stella Bowen's.  She was a member of the Twenty Melbourne Painters. She had a joint exhibition of oils, watercolours and pastels with fellow artists Dora Wilson and May Roxburgh in 1918. Sutherland had a history with Dora Wilson prior to later established artist societies, exhibiting as part of "The Waddy" in 1909, along with Janet Cumbrae Stewart and Nora Gurdon. She enjoyed doing landscapes, renting a cottage in Lilydale with Bernice Edwell and Florence Rodway to sketch the surrounding country. She also exhibited with the Yarra Sculptors' Society. 

She died in 1948. A memorial exhibition of her work referred to her as "a quiet artist in a mode of painting now largely abandoned" and that her works were most sympathetic.

Selected works

Exhibitions 

 1909, "The Waddy" society of artists, Guild Hall
 1909, Federal Art Exhibition, North terrace
 1911, Yarra Sculptors Society, Athenaeum Hall
 1912, "The Waddy" society (with Dora Taylor and Janet Cumbrae Stewart), Tuckett and Styles' Gallery
 1912, Group exhibition (with Dora Wilson and Nora Gurdon), Tuckett and Styles' Gallery
 1912 Victorian Artists Society autumn exhibition, Albert Street galleries
 1913, Group exhibition, Athenaeum Hall
 1914, Australian Art Association, Athenaeum Hall
 1914, British History Tableaux (in aid of Red Cross), Victorian Artists Society
 1914, Twelve Melbourne Painters Society second exhibition, Athenaeum Hall
 1915, Victorian Artists Society twentieth annual exhibition
 1916, Victorian Artists Society annual exhibition
 1916, French Week appeal exhibition, Town Hall
 1917, Australian Art Association fifth annual exhibition
 1918, Group exhibition (with Dora Wilson and May Roxburgh), Fine Art Society 
 1919, French aid exhibition, Fine Art Galleries
 1919, Twenty Melbourne Painters Society, Athenaeum Gallery
 1919, Melbourne Society of Women Painters and Sculptors annual exhibition, Victoria Markets
 1920, Twenty Melbourne Painters Society, Athenaeum Hall
 1940, Melbourne Society of Women Painters and Sculptors annual exhibition, Athenaeum Gallery
 1941, Melbourne Society of Women Painters and Sculptors annual exhibition, Athenaeum Gallery
 1950, Memorial exhibition for Ruth Sutherland, Melbourne Book Club Gallery

References

External links
 images of Ruth Sutherland's paintings on MutualArt
 Biographical cuttings on Ruth Sutherland, National Library of Australia
 Ruth Sutherland: Australian art and artists file, State Library Victoria

1884 births
1948 deaths
19th-century Australian women artists
20th-century Australian women artists
20th-century Australian artists
People from Adelaide
Australian people of Scottish descent
Artists from Melbourne
National Gallery of Victoria Art School alumni